Peploe is a surname which is shared by:

Samuel Peploe (bishop) (1667–1752), Bishop of Chester
Samuel Peploe (1871–1935), Scottish Post-Impressionist painter
Dorothy Emily Peploe, the married name of Scottish author D. E. Stevenson (1892–1973)
Clare Peploe (1941–2021), director, screenwriter and wife of Bernardo Bertolucci
Mark Peploe (born 1943), screenwriter and film director
Chris Peploe (born 1981), English cricketer
George Peploe, husband of actress Violet Carson
Edward Peploe Smith (1803–1847), son of George Smith (1765–1836), British Member of Parliament, banker and director of the East India Company
Daniel Peploe, High Sheriff of Herefordshire 1846
Daniel Peploe, Member of Parliament for Herefordshire 1874–1880

See also 

 Peploe Wood